The Ovens River, a perennial river of the north-east Murray catchment, part of the Murray-Darling basin, is located in the Alpine and Hume regions of the Australian state of Victoria.

Location and features
Formed by the confluence of the East and West Branches of the river, the Ovens River rises in the Victorian Alps, at the settlement of Harrietville, sourced by runoff from high slopes located within the Alpine National Park and the Mount Buffalo National Park. The river descends  over its  course. The Great Alpine Road follows much of the course of the river in its upper reaches.

Ovens Valley
The river flows through the Ovens Valley, which is a popular tourist destination servicing the ski fields of Mount Hotham, Mount Buffalo and Falls Creek, the Alpine National Park and the Mount Buffalo National Park.  Air sports such as gliding and paragliding are also practised here, and there is a hedge maze at Wandiligong.  A disused railway line has been converted to the Murray to the Mountains Rail Trail, a cycle trail which stretches from Wangaratta and Beechworth to Bright.

There are several wineries in the area, and many hops farms.  The wineries are a popular stop for cyclists on their touring rides.

Tobacco was a major industry in the valley until 2006; that year saw the British American Tobacco and Philip Morris companies decide to no longer buy Australian tobacco, and the Federal Government began implementing a plan to transition growers out of this industry. Reminders of the valley's long and prosperous tobacco history continue to dot the valley, such as the many tobacco kilns.

Etymology
Hamilton Hume and William Hovell explored the area in 1824, naming the Ovens River in honour of Major John Ovens, the Secretary to Thomas Brisbane, the Colonial Governor of New South Wales.

In the Aboriginal Waywurru language, the river has two names, Burwang, with no clearly defined meaning; and Djerrang, meaning "leaf".

List of towns
 Wangaratta
 Beechworth
 Everton
 Myrtleford
 Ovens
 Bright
 Wandiligong
 Harrietville
 Porepunkah

See also

 
 Warby-Ovens National Park

Gallery

References

External links

North-East catchment
Rivers of Hume (region)
Tributaries of the Murray River
Victorian Alps
Hume Highway